St Johns is a suburb in Auckland, New Zealand.

The suburb was named after St John's College, a religious training college established in what became the suburb in 1844 by Bishop Selwyn. The College of St John the Evangelist is the theological college of the Anglican Church in New Zealand and Polynesia. The complex of buildings occupies the crest of the hill and once commanded expansive views of the harbour to the north. The earliest buildings from the 1840s are the work of Frederick Thatcher, Bishop Selwyn's primary architect. Thatcher is largely responsible for what is now referred to as the "Selwyn Style"; wooden gothic buildings based on Saxon examples, primarily Greensted Church, in the small village of Greensted in Essex. These structures tend to have pronounced exposed wooden beams on the exterior, gabled 60-degree-pitch roofs and lancet windows.

To the south of Remuera Road lies Waiatarua Reserve. This is a natural basin, prone to seasonal flooding. On several 19th century maps this was shown as a lake and referred to as 'Lake Remuera', 'Lake St John' or 'Lake Waiatarua' although in reality it was largely an area of swampy ground in which a sheet of shallow water would appear sporadically in the wet season. In 1918,  of this land was given to the City Council to create Waiatarua Reserve. As the surrounding farm land was transformed into suburban housing this area became problematic - although in theory the "lake" afforded a picturesque view for the new houses but as it wasn't constantly present it couldn't really be used as a selling feature like Lake Pupuke on the North Shore. Conversely it was a breeding ground for mosquitoes and a source of smells as the basin was composed of a peat-like substance subject to smouldering fires which were difficult to put out. In 1929, a drain was bored through the hill to the south west enabling the water to be drained into the adjacent natural stream which feeds into the nearby Ōrākei Basin; this drainage system is still in place.

In 1934,  of the park were leased to the Remuera Golf Club and a course was laid out. The clubhouse was completed in 1935. In 1938 a new course was built around the original layout in response to members’ complaints about the course conditions. In 1968 the course was redesigned by golf course specialist Harold Babbage and a new club house was built.

Much of the suburb was developed in the 1960s and 70s when at that time it was seen as a popular place for families to live. The area is part of the zoning for Selwyn College, the local state secondary school. The nearby St John's Bush is a small chunk of remaining bush.

Demographics

Saint Johns had a population of 5,916 at the 2018 New Zealand census, an increase of 420 people (7.6%) since the 2013 census, and an increase of 474 people (8.7%) since the 2006 census. There were 2,055 households, comprising 2,859 males and 3,057 females, giving a sex ratio of 0.94 males per female, with 1,041 people (17.6%) aged under 15 years, 1,194 (20.2%) aged 15 to 29, 2,799 (47.3%) aged 30 to 64, and 876 (14.8%) aged 65 or older.

Ethnicities were 54.5% European/Pākehā, 6.0% Māori, 5.1% Pacific peoples, 38.8% Asian, and 4.1% other ethnicities. People may identify with more than one ethnicity.

The percentage of people born overseas was 49.3, compared with 27.1% nationally.

Although some people chose not to answer the census's question about religious affiliation, 43.1% had no religion, 38.7% were Christian, 0.2% had Māori religious beliefs, 4.3% were Hindu, 1.4% were Muslim, 3.6% were Buddhist and 3.2% had other religions.

Of those at least 15 years old, 2,046 (42.0%) people had a bachelor's or higher degree, and 381 (7.8%) people had no formal qualifications. 1,176 people (24.1%) earned over $70,000 compared to 17.2% nationally. The employment status of those at least 15 was that 2,559 (52.5%) people were employed full-time, 672 (13.8%) were part-time, and 174 (3.6%) were unemployed.

References

External links
Photographs of St Johns held in Auckland Libraries' heritage collections.

Suburbs of Auckland
Ōrākei Local Board Area